Lophocampa arpi is a moth of the family Erebidae. It was described by Paul Dognin in 1923. It is found in Brazil.

References

 
Lophocampa arpi at BOLD Systems

arpi
Moths described in 1923